Kabini bridge is a historic bridge in Karnataka constructed by local chieftain Dalvoy Devraj in 1730, spanning the Kabini river. It was laid over with a metre-gauge link connecting Mysore to Nanjangud in 1899. The bridge is 225 meters long with 56 piers and is built in gothic style. The last metre gauge train to run over it was in during January 17, 2007, after which the bridge was closed to traffic. 

The Mysore division of the South Western Railway have stated that they will renovate the bridge.

References

See Also 
Bridges in Karnataka

 List of bridges in India

 List of bridges in Karnataka